West Hartford Public Schools provides education for West Hartford, Hartford County, Connecticut, United States.

High schools 
 Conard High School
 Hall High School

Middle schools 
 Bristow Middle School
 King Philip Middle School
 Sedgwick Middle School

Students are assigned based on the location of their residence to either King Phillip or Sedgwick Middle School. Matriculation to Bristow is based on a lottery. Bristow is the smallest of the three middle schools.

Elementary schools 
 Aiken
 Braeburn
 Bugbee
 Charter Oak
 Duffy
 Morley
 Norfeldt
 Smith
 Webster Hill
 Whiting Lane
 Wolcott

Budget

2021
In March 2021, superintendent Tom Moore proposed a $176.3 million budget for the 2021-2022 academic year, an increase of 2.28% or $3.93 million. Increases in the budget are a result of salary increases, student outplacement, and transportation for additional busses for special education needs.

Demographics

As of October 1, 2018, the student population was 0.1% American Indian, 10.9% Asian, 8.1% Black, 19.4% Hispanic (of any race), 0.1% Native Hawaiian, 56.5% White, or 4.9% two or more races.

Controversies

High School Mascots and Nicknames
In 2015, the Board of Education voted to allow Conard and Hall high schools to keep their nicknames, Chieftain and Warrior, respectively, "provided all Native American imagery, including mascots, were eliminated." 

In 2022, the Board voted to end the use of the nicknames. A new state law would have cut some education funding if "an intramural or interscholastic athletic team associated with such school, uses any name, symbol or image that depicts, refers to or is associated with a state or federally recognized Native American tribe or a Native American individual, custom or tradition, as a mascot, nickname, logo or team name.”  The schools will choose new nicknames.

Later high school start times
In November 2019 the board of education removed a plan to have to schools start at a later start time. The claim is that later start times for high school students is more beneficial for their mental and physical health. The cost of transportation would exceed $2 million if high school and middle school started at 8:15. The issue was brought up again at a board of education meeting in February 2020. At this meeting the West Hartford board of education supports a statewide move to require that students in grades 6-12 to begin academic classes no earlier than 8:30 a.m. so they can arrive at school “healthy, awake, alert, and ready to learn.”

Superintendents

 Tom Moore, 2014-2022. Moore was named the 2022 Superintendent of the Year by the Connecticut Association of Public School Superintendents.
 Dr. Karen List, 2009-2014
 Dr. David P. Sklarz, 1995-2009

References

External links
 Official website

West Hartford, Connecticut
Education in Hartford County, Connecticut
School districts in Connecticut